Dirk Brouwer Award may refer to:
 Brouwer Award (Division on Dynamical Astronomy), an award given annually by the Division on Dynamical Astronomy of the American Astronomical Society
 Dirk Brouwer Award (American Astronautical Society), an award given annually by the American Astronautical Society

See also
 Dirk Brouwer